Ben Stallings (born August 27, 1987) is an American football fullback who is currently a free agent. He was signed by the Jacksonville Jaguars as an undrafted free agent in 2010. He played college football at Lambuth University.

External links
Arena Football League bio

1987 births
Living people
American football fullbacks
Delta State Statesmen football players
Lambuth Eagles football players
Utah Blaze players
Iowa Barnstormers players